Szilárd József Borbély (1 November 1963 – 19 February 2014) was a Hungarian academic, writer and poet. The Poetry Foundation identifies him as "one of the most important poets to emerge in post-1989 Hungary", who utilised several writing genres and predominantly dealt with subjects like grief, memory and trauma. 

Borbély suffered from "post-traumatic depression", related to the murder of his mother during a burglary in 2000 and the subsequent breakdown and death of his father, who had also been attacked. Borbély committed suicide on 19 February 2014.

Selected bibliography

Poetry
Adatok (1988)
Berlin-Hamlet (2003). Trans. Ottilie Mulzet (NYRB Poets, 2016)
Halotti pompa (first edition, 2004; second edition, 2006; third edition, 2014)
A testhez (2010)
Final Matters: Selected Poems, 2004-2010, trans. Ottilie Mulzet (Princeton University Press, 2019). Selections from Halotti pompa and A testhez.
Bukolikatájban (posthumous, 2022). In a Bucolic Land, trans. Ottilie Mulzet (NYRB Poets, 2022)

Novels
 Nincstelenek: Már elment a Mesijás? (2013). The Dispossessed, trans. Ottilie Mulzet (Harper Perennial, 2016)

References

External links
Foreign language rights to "The Dispossessed" at Suhrkamp Publishers.
Search results for works of Barbély held at British Academic libraries at COPAC
Diána Vonnák: Tracing Szilárd Borbély's poetry in "The Dispossessed" Asymptote Journal
An Interview with Szilárd Borbély Asymptote Journal

1963 births
2014 deaths
20th-century Hungarian poets
21st-century Hungarian poets
Hungarian writers
Hungarian academics
Hungarian literary historians
Attila József Prize recipients
2014 suicides
Suicides in Hungary